Rudolf Blügel (5 March 1927 – 7 August 1997) was a German politician of the Christian Democratic Union (CDU) and former member of the German Bundestag.

Life 
He joined the CDU in 1958. On 20 July 1979 he succeeded Werner Zeyer and was a member of the German Bundestag until the end of the 1980 legislative period. There he was a member of the Committee for Regional Planning, Building and Urban Development.

Literature

References

1927 births
1997 deaths
Members of the Bundestag for Saarland
Members of the Bundestag 1976–1980
Members of the Bundestag for the Christian Democratic Union of Germany